Flip Flap Railway was the name of a looping wooden roller coaster which operated for a number of years at Paul Boyton's Sea Lion Park on Coney Island in Brooklyn, New York. The coaster, which opened in 1895, was one of the first looping roller coasters to operate in North America. It was also notable for its engineering as well as the extreme G-forces that this engineering inflicted on riders.

History and design
The first looping roller coasters were built in Europe in the mid-1800s. These rides, known as "centrifugal railways", were initially designed to be temporary installations and they achieved little success.

The Flip Flap Railway was tested in Toledo, Ohio in 1888 by designer Lina Beecher before the coaster was moved to Coney Island. The coaster was tested with sand bags and monkeys before human riders were allowed on the coaster. The coaster had a single rail and riders rode two-to-a-car and sat in tandem. Sea Lion Park developer Boyton liked Beecher's coaster and decided to move it to Sea Lion Park.

Flip Flap Railway was shut down along with Sea Lion Park in 1902. While Sea Lion Park was replaced with Luna Park in 1903, Flip Flap Railway was not retained as it was not as popular.The 2-person cars also meant that it was difficult to turn a profit on the coaster.

Ride experience
Like the earlier centrifugal railways in Europe, Flip Flap Railway was notorious for the extreme g-forces that it produced in its riders. The circular nature of the coaster's loop, as well as its relatively small diameter of 25 feet, meant that it could produce forces of approximately 12 g. This caused riders to often experience discomfort and neck injuries from whiplash. Modern looping roller coasters use teardrop-shaped loops to greatly reduce these g-forces.

See also
Loop the Loop (Coney Island), the second looping roller coaster built on Coney Island.
Loop the Loop (Young's Pier), a looping coaster built in Atlantic City, New Jersey which was sometimes called Flip Flap Railway as well.
Loop the Loop (Olentangy Park), Lina Beecher's only other roller coaster. A looping steel coaster built at Olentangy Park near Columbus, Ohio.

References

Coney Island
Demolished buildings and structures in Brooklyn
Former roller coasters in New York (state)